Sergey Lomanov may refer to:
Sergey Lomanov, Sr. (born 1957), Russian bandy player
Sergey Lomanov, Jr. (born 1980), Russian bandy player